The Birdsville Developmental Road (State Route 14) is a mostly unsealed road in south-west Queensland that branches off the Diamantina Developmental Road at a point  west of Windorah and runs to Birdsville. The road crosses a major channel of the Diamantina River just before reaching Birdsville. It links with Cordillo Downs road (via Cordillo Downs station) and Arrabury Road (via Haddon Corner), both of which lead to the South Australian town of Innamincka.

Upgrades

Pave and seal
Two projects to pave and seal sections of the road are:
  of road at a cost of $4.5 million was completed in November 2021.
  of road at a cost of $3.75 million was to be completed by April 2022.

See also

 Highways in Australia
 List of highways in Queensland

References

Roads in Queensland